The Giolitti II government of Italy held office from 3 November 1903 until 12 March 1905, a total of 499 days, or 1 year, 4 months and 13 days.

Government parties
The government was composed by the following parties:

The cabinet was externally supported by the Italian Socialist Party.

Composition

References

Italian governments
1903 establishments in Italy